Miervaldis is a Latvian masculine given name, borne by some 600 men in Latvia.

Miervaldis is one of the relatively few names still in modern use from among the very many Latvian names of indigenous origin either revived from their previous occurrence in the Middle Ages, or invented, during the first Latvian National Awakening in the late 19th century. The second element -valdis ("ruler") was a particular favourite and featured in a large number of names now rare or obsolete.

The literal meaning of Miervaldis is "peace-ruler": mier from miers (peace) and the element -valdis as above. It is directly comparable to the Old East Slavic name Vladimir (but with the two elements reversed) and the Germanic name Friedrich.

Individuals
The name Miervaldis may refer to the following:
Miervaldis Birze, Latvian writer, publicist and physician
Miervaldis Adamsons, Latvian military leader
Miervaldis Drāznieks, Latvian footballer
Miervaldis Jurševskis, b. 1921, Latvian–Canadian chess master
Miervaldis Polis, b. 1948, Latvian artist
Liz Lemon (Elizabeth Miervaldis Lemon), lead character of US comedy show 30 Rock

Notes

Sources
 Pilsonības un Migrācijas Lietu Parvalde (PMLP): Office of Citizenship and Migration Affairs personal name database

References
 Siliņš, K., 1990: Latviešu personvārdu vārdnīca. Rīga: Zinātne 

Latvian masculine given names